Platismatia wheeleri is a species of lichen in the family Parmeliaceae. Known from western North America, it was described as new to science in 2011.

References

Parmeliaceae
Lichen species
Lichens described in 2011
Lichens of North America